Sabata may refer to:

Film 
 Sabata (film), the first film in The Sabata Trilogy, a series of spaghetti westerns
 Sabata, gunfighter played by Lee Van Cleef in The Sabata Trilogy

People 
 Victor de Sabata - Italian conductor and composer
 Xavier Sabata (1976), operatic countertenor
 Jaroslav Šabata (1927–2012) Czech political scientist, psychologist, and dissident
 Àngel Sabata (1911–1990) Spanish water polo player who competed in the 1928 Summer Olympics

Other 
 Sabata (city) - an ancient city in Sittacene, Ancient Assyria, also spelled Sabdata
 Sabata, List of characters in the Boktai series